Gneshwar Naveen (born 24 May 1994) is an Indian cricketer. He made his List A debut for Karnataka in the 2018–19 Vijay Hazare Trophy on 26 September 2018.

References

External links
 

1994 births
Living people
Indian cricketers
Karnataka cricketers
Place of birth missing (living people)